Packard is an unincorporated community located in the town of Wagner, Marinette County, Wisconsin, United States.

Geography

It is connected by road to McAllister to the south and Koss, Michigan to the north.

History
Packard was a stop between McAllister and Koss on the Wisconsin & Michigan (W. & M.) Railway line from Bagley Junction to Iron Mountain. The rail line through Packard was discontinued in 1938, when the tracks were torn out and the rolling stock sold off. The entire town was destroyed by a forest fire in October, 1908.

References

External links

Unincorporated communities in Marinette County, Wisconsin
Unincorporated communities in Wisconsin